The Church of All Saints is a Church of England parish church in Lullington, Somerset, England.

History

The earliest parts of this church date back to the 12th century, while the south aisle date to around 1280, and the chancel, tower and south porch to circa 1450. The church was restored in 1862 by Thomas Henry Wyatt and is now a Grade I listed building.

It has a two bay chancel and three-stage tower, while the north door of the church has a tree of life tympanum.

The interior includes a highly decorated font inscribed with "Hoc Fontis Sacro Peveunt Delicta Lavacro", which roughly translates to "in the sacred washing of the font sins are cleansed".

Notable clergy

Henry Waldegrave, 11th Earl Waldegrave was the rector of the village in the early 20th century.

Present day

The Anglican parish is part of the benefice of Beckington with Standerwick, Berkley, Lullington, Orchardleigh and Rodden within the archdeanery of Wells.

The church stands in the Conservative Evangelical tradition of the Church of England. The church uses the Book of Common Prayer, rather than the more modern Common Worship, for its services, and is a member of the Prayer Book Society.

Services

Services are held on mornings of the first, third and fifth Sundays of each month, while those on the second and fourth are held at the nearby Church of St Mary, Orchardlea.

See also

 List of Grade I listed buildings in Mendip
 List of towers in Somerset
 List of ecclesiastical parishes in the Diocese of Bath and Wells

References

Grade I listed churches in Somerset
Church of England church buildings in Mendip District
12th-century church buildings in England
Grade I listed buildings in Mendip District
Conservative evangelical Anglican churches in England